TriCities.com is an online source for news and information in the Tri-Cities (Johnson City, TN; Kingsport, TN; Bristol, TN-VA) area of northeast Tennessee and southwest Virginia.  The website debuted in June 2003, and unified two previous news websites for the region, wjhl.com and BristolNews.com.

In 2010, the Bristol Herald Courier working with TriCities.com won the Pulitzer Prize for Public Service, the highest honor in American journalism, for "illuminating the murky mismanagement of natural-gas royalties owed to thousands of land owners in southwest Virginia, spurring remedial action by state lawmakers."

Location
TriCities.com operations are based out of the WJHL-TV News Channel 11 building located at 338 East Main Street in Johnson City, TN. TriCities.com also has an office based out of the Bristol Herald Courier building located at 320 Bob Morrison Blvd in Bristol, VA.

Staff
TriCities.com is maintained by a staff of full-time employees as well as a host of other contributors from the Bristol Herald Courier and News Channel 11 (WJHL-TV).

Management
Director of Digital Media
Heather Provencher

Content
Content Coordinator

Sales
Sales and Marketing Assistant
Trish Sutherland

Awards
2008 Southern Newspaper Publishers Association - Best Web Site, Honorable Mention
2007 NAA ACME Awards - Online sports news coverage
2005 Regional Addy Award 
2004 Best Website Design, Tennessee Press Association

References

External links
 WJHL "News Channel 11"
 Tri-Cities News

American news websites
Herald Courier
Newspapers published in Virginia
Berkshire Hathaway
Mass media in Virginia
Pulitzer Prize-winning newspapers